Nazir Ahmed (1915-2008) was an Indian scholar, writer, and teacher of the Persian language. He was honoured by the Indian Government in 1987 with the Padma Shri. He received this award for his contributions to the propagation of Persian Language and literature.

Biography

Nazir Ahmed was born on 3 January 1915, in the small hamlet of Kolahi Gharib (Ghurrah/Gorra), near Gonda, in Uttar Pradesh, India. He attended a local primary school from which he graduated in 1930. He then attended Gonda High School to complete his matriculation in the first division, along with a distinction in mathematics in 1934. Subsequently, he joined Lucknow Christian College and completed his intermediary and Munshi examinations in 1936, and went on to secure a BA (Hons) in Persia in 1939, with first rank and first division. He completed his master's degree in 1940, acquiring a first rank, which earned him two gold medals and a scholarship for higher studies.

Ahmed started his career as a teacher at the Deoria Government High School, in Uttar Pradesh, immediately after the completion of his master's degree. He continued working there until he was transferred in 1943 to Basti Government High School. Professor Ahmed taught at the school for ten years, which he utilized for higher studies by pursuing research in Persia and enrolling for a PhD under the guidance of Prof. Masood Hasan Rizvi. He went on to earn his Doctoral degree in Zahoori (Tarshezi), in 1945. He continued his research by registering for D.Litt at the Lucknow University, and his thesis on the Persian poets of the Aadil-Shah period earned him the degree of D.Litt in 1950.

Ahmed joined Lucknow University as a lecturer in 1950 and continued his research and studies by securing a diploma in Farsi Baastan-e-Pahlawi and Modern Persian from the University of Teheran. He earned a second D.Litt, this time in Urdu, from Lucknow University for his research on Nauras of Adil Shah in 1956. After seven years of teaching at the Lucknow University, Nazir Ahmed moved to Aligarh Muslim University in 1957, as the Assistant Director of Aligarh-Taareekh-e-Urdu Adab, on invitation from the then Vice-Chancellor of AMU, Col. Bashir Zaidi. A year later in 1958, he became the Reader in the Department of Persian Language. In 1960, he became a Professor and Chairman of the department.

At AMU, Ahmed founded the quarterly journal, Fikro-Nazar, along with Professor Yousuf Hussain Khan, and served as its founding secretary. However, during the students' unrest of 1965 on minority issue, Professor Ahmed's life suffered a minor setback when his eldest son, Abdul Basit, got embroiled in the movement and got expelled from the University which resulted in Professor Ahmed's exit from the editorial board of the journal. In 1969, Ahmed became the Dean of the Faculty of Arts and retired from AMU service in 1977, when he was made the Professor Emeritus.

Nazir Ahmad died on October 19, 2008, in Aligarh. He inspired his daughter, Rehana Khatoon, to follow in his footsteps and she eventually became a Padma Shri winner and a scholar in her own right. Professor Ahmed's remains were buried in the Aligarh Muslim University graveyard.

Ahmed left a legacy by way of his students such as Prof. Azarmi Dukht Safavi, Prof. S. M. Tariq Hasan and Prof. Khalid Siddiqi, and through his studies on Mirza Ghalib whom he claimed to have been influenced by Bedil and Abul Fazal, but achieved literary success through the great poet's creative brilliance.

Positions
Nazir Ahmed has contributed to the propagation of the Persian language in more than one ways. He served in many academic committees and editorial boards of many Persian journals. He was a member of the editorial board of Ma-arif, a monthly journal published by the Darul Musannefin Shibli Academy Azamgarh. After taking part in the First International Conference on Amir Khusro held in Chicago in 1988, at the request of the Amir Khusro Society of America (AKSA), Professor Ahmed led a team of scholars in a project funded by the Smithsonian. This project was tasked with translating the works of Amir Khusro, with the support from Hakim Abdul Hameed, the founder of Jamia Hamdard of New Delhi and former Chancellor of Aligarh Muslim University. In connection with the UNESCO announcement declaring the year 1988 as the Year of Hafez, Professor Ahmed edited and published two old manuscripts by the 14th-century Persian mystic and poet.

Awards and recognitions
Ahmed was awarded the Padma Shri, in 1987. Twenty seven years later, his daughter, Rehana Khatton would also be honored by the Government of India.

He has also received many other awards such as:
 Ghalib Award - Ghalib Institute of New Delhi — 1976
 Presidential Award and Lifetime Fellowship — President of India - 1977
 Khusro Award - Amir Khusro Society of America (AKSA) - 1987
 Hafez Sanaash — Iranian Cultural Council of India - 1988
 Jaizah Afshar — Government of Iran - 1989
 DLitt (Honoris Causa) - University of Tehran, Iran — 1990

Publications
Some of the notable works of Ahmed are:

See also
 Professor Rehana Khatoon
 Mirza Ghalib
 Amir Khusro

References

1915 births
2008 deaths
Recipients of the Padma Shri in literature & education
Urdu-language writers from India
20th-century Indian scholars
20th-century Indian linguists
People from Gonda district
Persian-language writers
Scholars from Uttar Pradesh